Madhya Majuli is the middle part of Majuli, Jorhat, Assam. It is also called Natun Pohardia.

See also
Namoni Majuli
List of educational institutes in Majuli

External links

Geography of Assam
Majuli
Majuli district